Khashkhash ibn Saeed ibn Aswad (born in Pechina, Andalusia) was a Moorish navigator of Islamic Iberia.

According to Muslim historian Abu al-Hasan Ali al-Mas'udi (871-957), Khashkhash Ibn Saeed Ibn Aswad sailed over the Atlantic Ocean and discovered a previously unknown land. In his book The Meadows of Gold, al-Mas'udi writes that Khashkhash Ibn Saeed Ibn Aswad, from Delba (Palos de la Frontera) sailed into the Atlantic Ocean in 889 and returned with a shipload of valuable treasures.

Ali al-Masudi, in his historical account The Meadows of Gold (947 CE), wrote:

The same passage, in Aloys Sprenger's 1841 English translation, is interpreted by some authors to imply that Ali al-Masudi regarded the story of Khoshkhash to be a fanciful tale:

See also
Pre-Columbian trans-oceanic contact

References

Bibliography 
 Abul Hasan Ali Al-Masu'di (Masoudi) (ca. 895?-957 CE),The Book of Golden Meadows, c. 940 CE

9th-century births
Year of death missing
Admirals
Pre-Columbian trans-oceanic contact
Geographers of the medieval Islamic world
Scholars from al-Andalus
10th-century geographers
Al-Andalus military personnel
10th-century explorers
10th-century writers from al-Andalus